Gabrielle Johna Farrell (born 4 December 1997) is a US-born Jamaican footballer who plays as a forward for Serbian SuperLiga club ŽFK Spartak Subotica and the Jamaica women's national team.

Career
Farrell played for the FC Bucks Freedom club team in her youth, as well as the Neshaminy Redskins in high school. She helped Neshaminy win the state championship in 2013, and was an All-State team honoree in 2015. She was also a letter winner in basketball and track and field. In college, she played for the Liberty Lady Flames from 2016 to 2019. As a freshman in 2016, she was named in the Big South All-Tournament and All-Freshman teams, and was named the Big South Rookie of the Year. Farrell was named to the Big South first team in 2016 and second team in 2017, as well as the Atlantic Sun second team in 2018 and first team in 2019. In total, she made 77 appearances for the team, scoring 24 goals and recording 14 assists.

In 2020, Farrell was called up to the Jamaica women's national football team for the first time ahead of the 2020 CONCACAF Women's Olympic Qualifying Championship. She made her international debut on 4 February 2020, coming on as a substitute in the 71st minute for Tiffany Cameron against Saint Kitts and Nevis, with the match finishing as a 7–0 win.

References

External links
 

1997 births
Living people
Citizens of Jamaica through descent
Jamaican women's footballers
Women's association football forwards
ŽFK Spartak Subotica players
Jamaica women's international footballers
Jamaican expatriate women's footballers
Jamaican expatriate sportspeople in Serbia
Expatriate women's footballers in Serbia
People from Langhorne, Pennsylvania
Sportspeople from Bucks County, Pennsylvania
Soccer players from Pennsylvania
American women's soccer players
Liberty Flames and Lady Flames athletes
African-American women's soccer players
American sportspeople of Jamaican descent
American expatriate women's soccer players
American expatriate sportspeople in Serbia